Meezaan Jafri (born 9 March 1995) is an Indian actor who works in Hindi films. He is the son of actor Jaaved Jaffrey and the grandson of yesteryear actor Jagdeep, He is best known for role in Bollywood film Malaal, which earned him critical praise for his performance.

Early life
Jafri was born on 9 March 1995 to actor Jaaved Jaaferi and his wife Habiba Jaafery. He is the grandson of veteran actor Jagdeep. He studied business at the Franklin & Marshall College in Pennsylvania but then decided to study film direction and editing at the School of Visual Arts in New York.

Career

As assistant director
Meezaan assisted Sanjay Leela Bhansali and was the body double for Ranveer Singh in Padmavat. He was also an assistant director on Bajirao Mastani and Gangubai Kathiawadi.

As actor

In 2019, Jafri made his debut in Sanjay Leela Bhansali's Malaal, for which he won the Best Debutant Performer recognition at the Times Men of the Year awards 2020. He was next seen playing the lead role in the comedy-drama Hungama 2 which released on Disney+ Hotstar in 2021.

He will next appear in Sanjay Gupta's Miranda Boys along with Harshvardhan Rane.

Filmography

Films

References

External links
 

1995 births
Living people
Indian male film actors
Male actors in Hindi cinema
Male actors from Mumbai